Kali, is a form of Chhand (quatrain), a poetry bond under strict rules in Punjabi literature. Kali chhand is also used in singing as a type of Punjabi folk song where it is also known by its plural form, Kalian or Kaliyan. Although it is not so common in singing, it became a particular genre of Punjabi music. Kali is sung by only few Punjabi singers like Kuldeep Manak, Surinder Shinda and some more, but it was popularized by Kuldeep Manak with Tere Tille Ton written by Dev Tharike Wala (also known as Hardev Dilgir).

Types and subgenres

There are three types of the kali chhand: Suchchi Kali, Amba Kali and Roopa Kali.
Suchchi Kali
Suchchi Kali is bond under 42 Maatras.
Amba Kali
Amba Kali deals within 42 to 45 Maatras.
Roopa Kali
In Roopa Kali Maatras reaches up to 52. The popular kali, Tere Tille Ton, belongs to this type

Dev Tharike Wala and Kuldeep Manak

Dev Tharike Wala and Kuldeep Manak are the first personalities to introduce Kali to a common man. One of the kalian, Tere Tille Ton, written by Dev and sung by Manak, became so popular that people started regarding the singer as Kalian Da Badshah (English: King of Kalis). Manak sang only 13-14 Kalian in his career. People treated his every song, after Tere Tille Ton, to be a 'kali' as ordinary people don't understand the difference between a  song and kali.

Kalian by Kuldeep Manak

The very popular Kali of Manak, Tere Tille Ton, is a Roopa Kali. List of Kalian/Kaliyan sung by Manak:

Written by Dev Tharike Wala

Tere Tille Ton
Chhanna Choori Da
Ranjhe Da Patka
Pind Taan Sialan De Dhee Jammi Chaudhari
Teri Khatir Heere
Sehti Heer Ne Tiari Kar Layi Bagh Di
Charhi Jawani Te Chann Sooraj (Heer Dian Maa Naal)
Ik Din Kaidon Satth Vich (Kaidon Dian Choochak Naal)
Gall Sun Sialan Diye Kurhiye Ni
Ik Din Mil Ke Chaak Nu

Written by others

Amb Da Boota Rehnda.. (Gurmukh Singh Gill, JaboMaajra)
Ni Putt Jattan Da.. (Gurmukh Singh Gill, JaboMaajra)
Sehti Hassdi-Hassdi.. (Dalip Singh Sidhu, Kanakwal)

See also 
Ik Tara
Teri Khatar Heere

References

Punjabi literature
Punjabi music
Indian poetics
Punjabi-language songs